= Makkal Vizhippunarvu Iyakkam =

Makkal Vizhippunarvu Iyakkam (Tamil: மக்கள் விழிப்புணர்வ இயக்கம், "Popular Awareness Union") is a political party in the Indian state of Tamil Nadu. It was founded in 1999.
